La monaca di Monza may refer to:

 La monaca di Monza (1947 film), a film starring Rossano Brazzi
 La monaca di Monza (1962 film), a film starring Giovanna Ralli
 La monaca di Monza (1969 film), a film starring Anne Heywood
 La monaca di Monza (1987 film), a film starring Alessandro Gassman
 Virginia, la monaca di Monza, a film starring Giovanna Mezzogiorno